Tallulah Morton (born 27 November 1991) is an Australian fashion model living in North Sydney, New South Wales.

Early life and education
She was discovered at age 11 whilst on holiday on the Gold Coast. She started modeling when she was 13 and was studying at Wollumbin High School in Murwillumbah, New South Wales. She had her first professional modeling appearance in 2005, opening a show by Australian fashion designer Josh Goot. A 20-page shoot in fashion magazine Follow was published shortly thereafter, quickly leading to other work.  By 2006, Morton had made her New York City debut, at another Josh Goot show. Her age reportedly inhibited her ability to work in Europe initially, and was referenced again when bans on under-age modelling were mooted in 2007.

Career
Morton has featured on the cover of many Australian magazines including Follow, Russh twice and The Daily Telegraph's 'Sunday' (16 July 2006).  Her other magazine credits include Vogue, Marie Claire and Harper's Bazaar.

Morton has performed in shows such as Vivienne Westwood's Tokyo show, the World Merino Conference in Perth, New Zealand Fashion Week, and for David Jones. She also became the face of the Cue campaign, and Argentinian's fashion brand Complot.
In 2007, Tallulah made her Paris debut with Marilyn's, showing Dior, Gaultier & Viktor & Rolf winter collections. Morton has worked with prominent fashion photographers Patrick Demarchelier, Steven Meisel and David Sims, and with fashion designers Diane von Furstenberg and Phillip Lim. Morton is currently represented in Sydney by Chic Management.

References

External links

1991 births
Living people
Australian female models
Models from Sydney
People from the Northern Rivers